The Multi-State Lottery Association (MUSL) is an American non-profit, government-benefit association owned and operated by agreement of its 34 member lotteries. MUSL was created to facilitate the operation of multi-jurisdictional lottery games, most notably Powerball.

MUSL was formed in December 1987, by seven U.S. lotteries. Its first game was launched in February 1988, Lotto America. That game was changed to Powerball; its first drawing was in April 1992. Powerball was a unique game using two drums, suggested to MUSL by Steve Caputo of the Oregon Lottery.

Powerball/Mega Millions cross-selling
On October 13, 2009, MUSL signed an agreement with the consortium of states that operated the similar Mega Millions lottery, which allowed MUSL members to sell Mega Millions tickets and consortium members to sell Powerball tickets. On January 31, 2010, all but 2 of the 12 Mega Millions consortium lotteries began selling Powerball tickets. The consortium members did not join MUSL; they were licensed by MUSL to sell Powerball, and the consortium coordinates their Powerball participation with MUSL. Likewise, MUSL members may offer Mega Millions through a special MUSL product group that coordinates with the Mega Millions consortium.

Before the agreement, the only places that sold both Mega Millions and Powerball tickets were retailers that sat on state lines and offered multiple lotteries; one retailer on U.S. Route 62 straddling Sharon, Pennsylvania and Masury, Ohio sold both Mega Millions (via the Ohio Lottery) and Powerball (via the Pennsylvania Lottery) before the agreement and continues to be the only retailer to sell tickets for both states' lotteries.

As of 2016, Powerball and Mega Millions were both offered in 46 jurisdictions, including the District of Columbia and the U.S. Virgin Islands.  Powerball is also offered in Puerto Rico, where Mega Millions is not currently offered.

Other games
Besides Powerball, MUSL has operated the Hot Lotto and 2by2 draw games, and the Monopoly Millionaires' Club scratch-game series, including the MMC television game show; the game show aired its final episode in April 2016. (Wild Card held its final drawing on February 24, 2016).

Since MUSL games are multi-jurisdictional, these games need unanimous approval before one is changed. In other words, game changes for Mega Millions (46 members) or 2by2 (three members) must be approved by all lotteries offering that game before a new format is implemented. Game changes often are made in hopes of increasing a game's membership.

MUSL has retired several games, including 2by2, Ca$hola (video lottery), Daily Millions, Lotto*America, Rolldown, and the Powerball scratchcard game; the latter was tied to a weekly television game show produced for two years in Hollywood, California called Powerball: The Game Show (hosted by Bob Eubanks); then for two years from the Venetian Hotel in Las Vegas, called Powerball Instant Millionaire (hosted by Todd Newton. 2by2 was played in a similar fashion as Daily Millions was, but with a smaller top prize. The Hot Lotto game was be retired on October 28, 2017, with a new version of Lotto*America replacing it on November 12.

In September 2007, MUSL launched Midwest Millions, a scratch ticket game, in Iowa and Kansas; it was the country's first multi-jurisdictional scratch game since the Powerball television game shows. Midwest Millions returned in 2008 and 2009.

Ca$hola was retired on May 15, 2011, when its 37th jackpot was won. A replacement multi-jurisdictional video lottery game, MegaHits, began on July 15, 2011 in Delaware, Rhode Island, and West Virginia, the three lotteries which offered Ca$hola; MegaHits was then added in Maryland and Ohio. MegaHits ended on July 31, 2018.

Services
MUSL provides a variety of services for lotteries, including game design, management of game finances, production and up-linking of drawings, the development of common minimum information technology and security standards and inspections of lottery vendor sites; the building of a quantum-based Random number generator (RNG), coordination of common promotions and advertisements, coordination of public relations, and emergency back-drawing sites for lottery games. MUSL also hosts the Powerball website and the websites for more than a dozen U.S. lotteries. The Powerball website averages over 350,000 pageviews per day (over 10.5 million monthly.) MUSL provides these services to the lotteries at no cost. MUSL earns its income from non-game sources such as earnings on its accounts, bond swaps, and licensing of its trademarks. MUSL owns the patents and trademarks involved in its operations, holding them for the benefit of its members.

MUSL's former director is Chuck Strutt, who was the association's first employee in 1987. Strutt directly responded to players and writes MUSL's unusual FAQ, which elicits strong responses from readers who may find it humorous or insulting. 

MUSL games operate under the same core game rules in each jurisdiction; however, each lottery is free to vary rules pertaining to such things as purchase age, the claim period, and some validation processes.

Hot Lotto fraud scandal

In December 2010, a jackpot-winning ticket for the Hot Lotto jackpot was purchased near MUSL headquarters. However, the ticket was not claimed until just before the Iowa Lottery's one-year deadline. At that time, an attorney from New York state attempted to claim the jackpot on behalf of a Belize trust. The trust later decided not to pursue the claim, to avoid revealing the purchaser's identity.

In January 2015, Edward Tipton, MUSL's Director of Information Security, was arrested. Authorities determined that he was the purchaser by reviewing a convenience store's video footage. In March 2015, a second man, Robert Rhodes, from Texas, was arrested in connection to the fraud.

Tipton was convicted in July 2015 of two counts of fraud and sentenced to 10 years in prison. He posted $10,000 bond and was released pending appeal. Authorities suspected that Tipton rigged drawings in at least four states, and as a result of their investigation he was charged in October 2015 for crimes in 2005 and 2007.

Eddie Tipton was sentenced to 25 years in an Iowa court in 2017 for gaming multiple lotteries by installing a rootkit in the computer running the RNG used by MUSL for the drawings. The rootkit changed the behavior of the RNG, allowing Tipton to predict the numbers that would be drawn. The MUSL gaming software had been approved by Gaming Laboratories International.

Members
MUSL's membership consists of 38 lotteries (including those of the District of Columbia, Puerto Rico, and the Virgin Islands) which offered Powerball prior to the January 31, 2010 beginning of cross-selling with the 12 lotteries operating Mega Millions. Mississippi became the 35th state to join in 2019, with ticket sales planned for 2020.

The 38 MUSL members, alphabetically (and when joined):

References

External links

Lotteries in the United States